The list of ship commissionings in 1921 includes a chronological list of ships commissioned in 1921.  In cases where no official commissioning ceremony was held, the date of service entry may be used instead.


References

See also 

1921
 Ship decommissionings
 Ship launches
Ship launches